George Henry Davenport (1831–1881) was a politician in Queensland, Australia. He was a Member of the Queensland Legislative Assembly.

Early life

Parents 
Davenport's parents were George Francis and Eliza (née Davenport). Davenport was born in Oxford, England on 30 October 1831 and was educated in Edinburgh, Scotland.

Davenport's father selected land in South Australia in 1839. Uncle (Robert Davenport) settled in South Australia. Francis returned to England in 1841, and was accompanied by another uncle, Samuel Davenport, in 1843 on the return to South Australia. Francis died soon after arriving, and Robert and Samuel settled on the estate.

George followed his uncles to South Australia soon after leaving school. After a few years he went to live in Melbourne.

Darling Downs 
Davenport went to Toowoomba lured by land development. He looked to acquire a freehold property. C.B. Fisher became a partner in the scheme where it was shown that agriculture could be profitably combined with grazing. The property was called Headington Hill. All the newest and latest machinery was used on this property.

Davenport was the member for the Electoral district of Drayton and Toowoomba from 15 November 1878 to 1 January 1881.

Davenport died on New Year's Day 1881 in Toowoomba during his term of office.

Religion 
Davenport was a member of the Church of England.

Marriages 
Davenport married Elizabeth Young in Dalby on 27 May 1866.

References

Members of the Queensland Legislative Assembly
1831 births
1881 deaths
19th-century Australian politicians